Eremophila jucunda subsp. jucunda is a plant in the figwort family, Scrophulariaceae and is endemic to Western Australia.  It is a small shrub with hairy leaves and white to violet flowers often growing on stony hillsides. It is similar to subspecies pulcherrima but is distinguished from it by its yellow new growth and more southerly distribution.

Description
The young leaves and branches are bright yellow.

The 5 petals form a tube  which is more or less hairy on the outer surface.

Taxonomy and naming
Eremophila jucunda subsp. jucunda is an autonym and therefore the taxonomy is the same as for Eremophila jucunda.

Distribution and habitat
Eremophila jucunda subsp. jucunda grows on stony flats or hillsides, often in mulga woodland. It occurs in a broad area between Sandstone and  Mount Vernon.

Conservation
Eremophila jucunda subspecies jucunda is classified as "not threatened" by the Western Australian Government Department of Parks and Wildlife.

References

jucunda subsp. jucunda